Ed Clark (July 3, 1911, Nashville, Tennessee – January 22, 2000, Sarasota, Florida) was a photographer who worked primarily for Life magazine. His best remembered work captured a weeping Graham W. Jackson, Sr. playing his accordion as the body of the recently deceased President Franklin D. Roosevelt was being transported to Washington, DC.

The Nashville Tennessean
Clark dropped out of Hume-Fogg High School after he told the editor of the Nashville Tennessean newspaper he was a photographer and got a job as an assistant. "I lied," he later admitted. He recalled that "Covering a parade once, I used too much flash powder and nearly blew myself off the roof". However, he learned quickly and was promoted to staff photographer, a position he held for 13 years.

Life magazine
His work came to the notice of Life, which made him a stringer in 1936. A 1942 photograph of World War I hero Alvin York registering for "The Old Man's Draft" brought a job offer, but he turned it down; "I was raising two young boys, and New York didn't seem like the place to raise them," he later explained. However, he changed his mind, becoming a staff photographer in 1944, after Life allowed him to remain in Tennessee for a few years.

Graham Jackson photograph
When he received a telephone call informing him that President Franklin D. Roosevelt had died, he drove all night from his home in Nashville to Warm Springs, Georgia. As the President's body was being taken to the train station, Clark, alone among the swarm of photographers present, noticed United States Navy bandsman Graham W. Jackson, Sr. playing "Goin' Home", one of Roosevelt's favorite tunes, on his accordion as tears ran down his face. The iconic photograph was published full page in the April 17, 1945, issue of Life, capturing the nation's grief.

Post-war
In 1945, he was temporarily assigned to the Paris offices. At the Nuremberg Trials, Clark photographed Hermann Göring.

In 1948, a series of photographs documented the gross inequality in educational resources allocated to white versus black children in the West Memphis School District of Arkansas; a single teacher had 100 black students, crammed into a single classroom. The Life story led to the construction of a new building for them.

That same year, Clark was assigned to the Los Angeles bureau, where he became acquainted with Hollywood stars. He was the only photographer invited to the wedding reception of Humphrey Bogart and Lauren Bacall. Around 1950, a friend told him of a "hot tomato" who had just signed with Twentieth Century-Fox. He took a series of pictures of a then unknown Marilyn Monroe which were not published at the time; much later, they came to light during a search of Lifes archives.

He was also in the good graces of presidents. He took a portrait of Dwight D. Eisenhower using a Mathew Brady camera. On Eisenhower's last day as President, Clark was the only photographer permitted in the Oval Office. Another memorable photo showed then Senator John F. Kennedy spending time with his baby daughter Caroline. The Kennedys were so pleased with the result that it hung in the Oval Office after he was elected, and Jackie Kennedy asked for 75 copies.

In 1955, Clark received an unexpected invitation from the Soviet Union. He became the first Western photographer allowed behind the Iron Curtain in 30 years. The same year, Edward Steichen included his work in MoMA's blockbuster, world-touring The Family of Man exhibition, seen by more than nine million people.

Due to budgetary cutbacks, Life let go a third of its photographic staff in 1963, Ed Clark among them. By then, his vision had become impaired due to a cataract.

Later life
He became a building contractor in Bethesda, Maryland or Washington.

In 1982, a doctor removed his cataract and implanted a new lens, restoring his vision. With his eyesight restored, he took pictures for publications such as the Washingtonian and the Ladies Home Journal.

In 1990, he was awarded the Photographic Society of America's Understanding Through Photography Award.

He took some courses on modern methods of black-and-white and color printing at Nashville State Tech. He later donated his collection to that institution.

Ed Clark and his wife Joyce moved to Sarasota, Florida. He died there on January 22, 2000, at the age of 88. His first wife, Garnet, predeceased him. He was survived by Joyce, his son Tom (from his first marriage), two grandchildren and three great-grandchildren.

References

External links
 Time magazine article about Clark's photograph of Graham Jackson, including the photo
 Life magazine article "The Photography of Edward Clark", including photos of Clark, John F. Kennedy/Caroline Kennedy and Graham Jackson

1911 births
2000 deaths
20th-century American photographers
Life (magazine) photojournalists
People from Nashville, Tennessee